, is a third class airport located  southwest of Gotō, Nagasaki Prefecture, off the western coast of Kyūshū, Japan. The airport also serves the city of Fukue. Currently the terminal building's exterior displays both names. Tsubaki means camellia, and is a notable reference on Fukue Island which is famed for producing camellia oil and is home to two ancient camellia trees each over 300 years old that have been declared 'national monuments'

Airlines and destinations

References

External links
 Goto Fukue Airport 
 
 

Airports in Japan
Transport in Nagasaki Prefecture
Buildings and structures in Nagasaki Prefecture